Sylvain Martel is a Canadian researcher noted for his work on the development of innovative cancer treatments. Martel is a professor at the Ecole Polytechnique de Montreal, Canada and the Director of the NanoRobotics Laboratory. He was named Fellow of the Institute of Electrical and Electronics Engineers (IEEE) in 2015 for contributions to medical micro- and nano-robotics and holds a Tier 1 Canada Research Chair.

References 

Fellow Members of the IEEE
Living people
Year of birth missing (living people)